Malcolm D. Lee (born January 11, 1970) is an American filmmaker. He is known for directing numerous comedy films, including The Best Man (1999), Undercover Brother (2002), Roll Bounce (2005), Welcome Home Roscoe Jenkins (2008), Soul Men (2008), Scary Movie 5 (2013), The Best Man Holiday (2013), Girls Trip (2017), Night School (2018), and Space Jam: A New Legacy (2021).

Early life 
Malcolm D. Lee was born on January 11, 1970, in Queens, New York City. He is a graduate of Packer Collegiate Institute and Georgetown University.

He is the cousin of filmmakers Spike Lee, Joie Lee and Cinqué Lee, and still photographer David Lee.

Career 
Lee has directed such films as Undercover Brother, The Best Man, Roll Bounce, Welcome Home Roscoe Jenkins, Soul Men and Girls Trip. He also directed an episode of the sitcom Everybody Hates Chris. He directed an installment in the Scary Movie franchise, Scary Movie 5. In 2013, he directed The Best Man Holiday, a sequel to The Best Man.

In 2017 Girls Trip, starring Regina Hall, Queen Latifah, Tiffany Haddish and Jada Pinkett Smith, received positive reviews from critics and grossed $137 million worldwide; it also grossed over $100 million domestically, the first comedy of 2017 to do so. The success led to a first look deal with Universal Pictures.

In 2021, Lee directed a sequel to Space Jam titled Space Jam: A New Legacy, starring LeBron James and Don Cheadle. The film received mostly negative reviews from critics and was a box office failure.

Lee has expressed interest in making a third Space Jam film with Dwayne Johnson as the lead and focusing on wrestling instead of basketball.

Filmography 
Films

Television

Other credits

References

External links 
 
 

1970 births
20th-century African-American people
21st-century African-American people
African-American film directors
African-American male writers
African-American screenwriters
American male screenwriters
Comedy film directors
Film directors from New York City
Film producers from New York (state)
Georgetown University alumni
Lee family (show business)
Living people
People from Queens, New York
Screenwriters from New York (state)